Andrea Romeo (born 11 June 1985) is an Italian slalom canoeist who competed at the international level from 2001 to 2016.

He won a gold medal in the K1 team event at the 2013 ICF Canoe Slalom World Championships in Prague. He also won a bronze medal in the same event at the 2015 European Championships in Markkleeberg.

World Cup individual podiums

References

External links 

 Andrea ROMEO at CanoeSlalom.net
 

Living people
Italian male canoeists
1985 births
Medalists at the ICF Canoe Slalom World Championships